Danae Elon (born December 23, 1970), is an Israeli documentary filmmaker and cinematographer based in Montreal Quebec.

Biography
Danae Elon was born in Jerusalem. She is the daughter of journalist and author Amos Elon, and Beth Elon. Elon graduated from New York University in 1995.

Film career 
In 2009 she received the Guggenheim fellowship in the category of film. Her work has often centered around Jerusalem and the Palestinian struggle. Wild Mint, which she directed and produced, and Cut which she photographed and co-produced were the first films she attempted to reconcile state ideology and reality.

In 2001 Elon produced her first critically acclaimed film  Another Road Home which received a grant from the Sundance Institute Documentary Program in 2003. The film premiered at the 2004 Tribeca film festival and was showcased in over 20 international film festivals, including IDFA, Los Angeles Film Festival, Jerusalem Film Festival, Hot Docs, Encounters South Africa and Gothenburg. Another Road Home was theatrically released in 2005 and was shown in fifteen US cities. It was broadcast on the Sundance channel, BBC, Finnish, Belgian, New Zealand, Swedish, and on both Al Jazeera and Israeli television. It was cited as one of the most important films about the subject. Her second feature documentary was Partly Private, about male circumcision. An Israeli-Canadian co-production, it was screened on ARTE France, TV Ontario, Canal Vie, TV2 Denmark, and Channel 8 Israel. Three other critically acclaimed and award winning documentary films by Elon are P.S Jerusalem, The Patriarch's Room and A Sister's Song.

Academic career
Elon was a lecturer at the Sapir Academic College and head of the Israeli documentary program at Cinema South International Film Festival She is currently an adjunct lecturer at Queens University at Kingston.

Awards and recognition
Her first documentary film Never Again Forever, released in 1996 showcased in over 25 international film festivals and received a Golden Spire award from the San Francisco International Film Festival as well as an achievement award from the Chicago International Film Festival.

Partly Private premiered in the 2009 Tribeca film festival and won the Best New York Documentary award.

She won two awards for Another Road Home a bronze medal from the Warsaw International Film Festival, and best documentary from Tursak Film Festival in Istanbul.
The Patriarch's Room won Best research and Music award at the Docaviv film festival as well as Best documentary at the Toronto Jewish Film Festival and Best Documentary at the Beyond Border's Film Festival in Greece. For a Sister's Song she is the recipient of the AIDC award for innovation in documentary filmmaking as well as an Iris Award for cinematography.

Filmography

References

Living people
1970 births
Israeli documentary film directors
Israeli women film directors